Aspects  is a 1976 album by Larry Coryell and The Eleventh House.

Track listing

Side one
 "Kowloon Jag" (Larry Coryell) – 5:48
 "Titus" (Danny Toan) – 5.30
 "Pyramids" (Mike Mandel) – 5:22
 "Rodrigo Reflections"* (Larry Coryell) – 4:38

Side two
 "Yin-Yang" (John Lee, Gerry Brown) – 4:44
 "Woman of Truth and Future" (Mike Mandel) – 6:08
 "Ain't It Is" (John Lee) – 5:03
 "Aspects" (Larry Coryell) – 4:25

Personnel
 Larry Coryell – electric and acoustic guitars
 Terumasa Hino – trumpet, flugelhorn
 Mike Mandel – keyboards
 John Lee – bass guitar
 Gerry Brown – drums

Guests
 Randy Brecker – trumpet
 David Sanborn – alto saxophone
 Michael Brecker – tenor saxophone
 Steve Khan – acoustic guitar
 Danny Toan – rhythm guitar
 James Mtume – percussion

References

1976 albums
Arista Records albums
Larry Coryell albums